This is a list of some of the cemeteries in New Zealand.

North Island

Whangarei District
Maunu Cemetery

also Kaurihorore, Onerahi, Kamo, Ngunguru, Whangarei Heads, Kioreroa, Mission Ground, Whananaki, Marua

Auckland
 Auckland Memorial Park
 Birkenhead-Glenfield Cemetery
 Hillsborough Cemetery
 Mangere Lawn Cemetery
 Manukau Memorial Gardens
 North Shore Memorial Park
 Papakura Cemetery
 Papakura South Cemetery
 Pukekohe Cemetery
 Purewa Cemetery
 St Peter's in the Forest Cemetery
 Symonds Street Cemetery
 Waikumete Cemetery
 Waiuku Cemetery

Wellington
Wellington City
Bolton Street Memorial Park
Karori Cemetery
Makara Cemetery
Mount Street Cemetery
also Johnsonville Methodist Cemetery, St John's Anglican Church (Johnsonville), St Mary's Anglican Church (Karori), Linden Cemetery, St Matthias (Makara), Holy Trinity Anglican Church (Ohariu Valley), Ohariu Valley Catholic Cemetery, Tawa Anglican Churchyard. 
Hutt City
Taitā Cemetery
also Christ Church (Taitā), Wesleyan Cemetery (Memorial in Bridge Street, Lower Hutt), Knox Presbyterian Church (Lower Hutt), Korokoro Catholic Cemetery, Owhiti Maori Cemetery (Seaview), St James Anglican Church (Lower Hutt), Te Puni Cemetery (Petone), Wainuiomata Methodist Church, Somes Island Cemetery, Waiwhetu Marae.
Upper Hutt City
Akatarawa Cemetery
also St John's Anglican Churchyard (Trentham), St Joseph's Catholic Burial Ground, Wallaceville Cemetery.
Porirua City
Whenua Tapu Cemetery
also Porirua Cemetery, Pauatahanui Burial Ground, St Joseph's Church Graveyard.

Elsewhere
Hamilton Park Cemetery, Hamilton
Park Island Cemetery, Napier
Te Henui Cemetery, New Plymouth

South Island

Christchurch
Addington Cemetery
Avonhead Cemetery
Barbadoes Street Cemetery, Christchurch's oldest cemetery, located in the central city
Bromley Cemetery
Graveyard at Holy Trinity Avonside
Linwood Cemetery, Christchurch
Memorial Park Cemetery, Christchurch
Ruru Lawn Cemetery
St. Paul's Cemetery, Christchurch
Waimairi Cemetery
Woolston Cemetery

Dunedin
 Andersons Bay Cemetery
 Arthur Street Cemetery, Dunedin's first cemetery, on City Rise. All bodies later moved elsewhere
 Broad Bay Cemetery
 Dunedin Cemetery, Waldronville
 Dunedin Northern Cemetery
 Dunedin Southern Cemetery
 Macadrew Bay Cemetery
 Port Chalmers Cemetery
 Portobello Cemetery
 Waitati Cemetery

Elsewhere
 Wakapuaka Cemetery, Nelson
 Queenstown-Lakes District: Albert Town, Arrowtown, Cardrona, Frankton, Glenorchy, Kingston, Makarora, Queenstown, Skippers Point, Wanaka, Lake Hawea.
 Central Otago District: Alexandra, Clyde, Cromwell, Ranfurly, Naseby (Council); Blackstone Hill, Danseys Pass/Kyeburn Diggings, Drybread, Ettrick, Gimmerburn, Ida Valley/Moa Creek, Kyeburn-Kokonga/Swinburn, Kyeburn Diggings, Millers Flat, Omakau/Blacks, Roxburgh, St. Bathans Public and Church, St. Bathans Catholic, Tarras (Cemetery Trust); Hamiltons, Nevis (closed).
 Clutha District: Balclutha, Fairfax (Tokoiti), Kaitangata, Lawrence, Tapanui (urban); Port Molyneux, Romahapa, Taieri Beach, Waihola, Waikoikoi, Waipahi, Waipori, Waitahuna (rural); Clinton, Crookston, Owaka, Tuapeka (Cemetery Trust).
 Southland District: Edendale, Lumsden, Wallacetown, Woodlands, Wyndham, Centre Hill, Otautau, Wairio, Wreys Bush, Dipton, East Winton, Winton, Lynwood, Halfmoon Bay, Riverton (Council); Athol, Balfour, Calcium, Forest Hill, Fortrose, Garston, Orepuki, Quarry Hills, Riversdale, Tuatapere, Waikaia, Waikawa (Cemetery Trust).
 Gore District: Otaraia, Charlton Park, Gore, Mataura, Pukerau, Waikaka.
 Invercargill City: Eastern, Saint John's, Bluff, Green Point.

References

External links
Cemeteries in Auckland, Auckland City Libraries
Cemeteries in New Zealand: Cemetery information and burial records outside Auckland, Auckland City Libraries
Christchurch City Libraries New Zealand cemetery database

New Zealand
 
Cemeteries